Henry Sadler or Sadleir ( – 17 March 1618), of Everleigh, Wiltshire and Hungerford, Berkshire, was an English politician who sat in the House of Commons between 1571 and 1587. He was elected MP for Lancaster in 1571, 1572, 1584, 1586 and was Sheriff of Wiltshire in 1595-6.

Sadler was born about 1538, the third son of Sir Ralph Sadler (1507 – 1587) of Hackney, Middlesex and Standon, Hertfordshire and Ellen Mitchell, daughter of John Mitchell of Much Hadham, Hertfordshire and "widow" of Matthew Barre of Sevenoaks, Kent.

He was a student at Gonville and Caius College, Cambridge in 1558.

He was Steward of Duchy of Lancaster lands in Wiltshire from 1570 to 1618, Clerk of the Hanaper from 1572 to 1604, constable of Leicester Castle in 1576, Justice of the peace in the Court of quarter sessions for Wiltshire in 1592 and Sheriff of Wiltshire in 1595-6.

Sadler entertained the King and Queen at Everleigh on 31 August 1603.

He married, firstly, Dorothy Gilbert, daughter of Edward Gilbert of Everleigh, Wiltshire, by whom he had children, including:
 Thomas Sadler
 Gertrude Sadler
 Dorothy Sadler
 Grace Sadler
 Ellen Sadler

He married, secondly, Ursula Gill, daughter of John Gill of Widial, Hertfordshire, by whom he had children, including:
 Francis Sadler
 Joan Sadler

Henry Sadler died on 17 March 1618, ten days after his eldest son, and was buried in Hungerford church. A life interest in the lands at Everley and Hungerford was bequeathed to his "well-beloved wife" Ursula, the sole executrix, with a reversion to the eldest surviving son of their marriage. His daughter Joan was left a farm and tenement in Middle Everley, three score ewes and their pasture, and £1,000. In a codicil, he arranged the disinheritance of his son Francis if he lived abroad or fell "into the Romish or Popish religion". He was succeeded by Francis Sadler.

References

Sources

1538 births
1618 deaths
People from Wiltshire
People from Hungerford
English MPs 1571
English MPs 1572–1583
English MPs 1584–1585
English MPs 1586–1587
High Sheriffs of Wiltshire
Henry